The Svitanok coal mine is a large coal mine located in the south-east of Ukraine in Donetsk Oblast. Svitanok represents one of the largest coal reserves in Ukraine having estimated reserves of 14.3 million tonnes. The annual coal production is around 463,000 tonnes.

See also 

 Coal in Ukraine
 List of mines in Ukraine

References 

Coal mines in Ukraine
Economy of Donetsk Oblast
Coal mines in the Soviet Union